Marta Perarnau Vives (born 20 April 1995) is a footballer who plays as a right back for Liga MX Femenil club Atlético San Luis. Born in Spain, she was an Azerbaijan youth international.

Career

Perarnau started her career with Spanish side Rayo Vallecano. In 2021, she signed for Atlético San Luis in Mexico.

Personal life

Perarnau is the daughter of Spanish journalist Martí Perarnau and Spanish runner, journalist, and trainer .

References

External links
 
 

1995 births
Azerbaijani women's footballers
Expatriate women's footballers in Mexico
Liga MX Femenil players
Living people
Naturalized citizens of Azerbaijan
Footballers from Manresa
Primera División (women) players
Rayo Vallecano Femenino players
Real Betis Féminas players
Spanish expatriate sportspeople in Mexico
Spanish women's footballers
Sportswomen from Catalonia
Women's association football fullbacks